Marsupina is a genus of sea snails, marine gastropod mollusks in the family Bursidae, the frog shells.

Species
Species within the genus Marsupina include:

 Marsupina bufo (Bruguière, 1792)
 Marsupina nana (Broderip & G.B. Sowerby I, 1829)

References

External links

Bursidae